L'Héritage de Rantanplan is a Lucky Luke adventure written by Goscinny and illustrated by Morris. It is the forty first book in the series and was originally published in French in the year 1973 and in English by Cinebook in 2020 as Rin Tin Can's Inheritance.

Synopsis 
A former prisoner of the penitentiary where Rantanplan is located, the late Oggie Svenson, bequeaths his vast fortune in real estate to the latter, who leaves prison to live in his hotel under the protection of Lucky Luke in Virginia City. But the will states that if the dog dies, everything would go to Joe Dalton. Learning of this, the Daltons escape and attempt to kill Rantanplan.

Characters 

 The Daltons: Four dumb, nasty bandit brothers.
 Rantanplan: "The dumbest dog in the west".

Notes 
Mark Twain appears in two panels on page 13.

External links

Lucky Luke official site album index 
Goscinny website on Lucky Luke

Comics by Morris (cartoonist)
Lucky Luke albums
1973 graphic novels
Works by René Goscinny